Royal Flush is a 1932 British historical novel by the British writer Margaret Irwin. It portrays the married life of Henrietta Stuart, known as Minette, who married into the French royal family in the mid-seventeenth century. In particular it focuses on her careful diplomatic relationship with her brother Charles II, climaxing in the Treaty of Dover.

References

Bibliography
 Kirkpatrick, D. L. Twentieth-century Romance and Gothic Writers. Gale Research, 1982.

1932 British novels
Novels by Margaret Irwin
British historical novels
Novels set in England
Novels set in the 17th century
Chatto & Windus books